Ralph Francis Broberg (21 July 1899 – 3 September 1938) was an English cricketer.  Broberg's batting style is unknown, but it is known he bowled slow left-arm orthodox.  He was born at Birmingham, Warwickshire.

Broberg made a single first-class appearance for Warwickshire against Somerset at Edgbaston in the 1920 County Championship.  Warwickshire won the toss and elected to bat, making 220 all out, with Broberg being dismissed for 4 runs by Philip Foy.  In response, Somerset made 231 all out, during which he bowled five wicketless overs for the cost of 16 runs.  Warwickshire reached 98/6 in their second-innings, at which point the match was declared a draw.  This was his only major appearance for Warwickshire.

He died at Hall Green, Worcestershire, on 3 September 1938.

References

External links
Ralph Broberg at ESPNcricinfo

1899 births
1938 deaths
Cricketers from Birmingham, West Midlands
English cricketers
Warwickshire cricketers
English cricketers of 1919 to 1945